Antwerp is a city in Belgium and capital of the Antwerp province.

Antwerp may also refer to:

In Belgium
 Antwerp (district)
 Antwerp (province)

In the United States
 Antwerp, Ohio
 Antwerp Township, Michigan
 Antwerp, New York
 Antwerp (village), New York

In Australia
Antwerp, Victoria

Other 
Port of Antwerp
Royal Antwerp FC, a football club
Antwerp (novel), by Roberto Bolaño
Antwerp, a poem by Ford Madox Ford

See also